William IV (died 1030) was the Count of Provence from 1018 to his death. He was a son of William II, whom he succeeded, and a co-count with his brothers Fulk and Geoffrey. He appears in many charters of his mother, Gerberga, who acted as his regent until 1019. He was the eldest amongst his siblings and he seems to have been the first to carry the title of comes.

References
Medieval Lands Project: Provence.

1030 deaths
Counts of Provence
Year of birth unknown